El Caribe (The Caribbean) was a biweekly newspaper published from Roatán, Honduras. It was edited by Tomás B. McField. Rafael Barahona Mejía was the director of El Caribe.

The newspaper published its first edition in Roatán, Honduras on 1 June 1918.

References

Publications established in 1918
Newspapers published in Honduras
Spanish-language newspapers
1918 establishments in Honduras
Roatán